is a railway station located in Higashiyama-ku, Kyoto, Kyoto Prefecture, Japan.

Lines
Keihan Electric Railway
Keihan Main Line

Adjacent stations

References

Railway stations in Kyoto